Colegio Arrayanes is a Chilean high school located in San Fernando, Colchagua Province, Chile.

References 

Educational institutions established in 1991
1991 establishments in Chile
Secondary schools in Chile
Schools in Colchagua Province